"Everybody Plays the Fool" is a 1972 song first recorded by American R&B group The Main Ingredient, and written by J. R. Bailey, Rudy Clark and Ken Williams. It was the first single released from the group's album Bitter Sweet, released with the B-side "Who Can I Turn To (When Nobody Needs Me?)". "Everybody Plays the Fool" was the group's highest charting hit single, reaching No. 3 on the Billboard Hot 100 chart in the fall of 1972. It also peaked at No. 2 on the Billboard R&B chart and at No. 25 on the Billboard adult contemporary chart. It was certified gold by the RIAA.

The song was nominated for the Grammy Award for Best R&B Song at the 1973 ceremony, losing to "Papa Was a Rollin' Stone".

A 1991 cover of the song by Aaron Neville, from the album Warm Your Heart, was also successful, reaching #8 on the Billboard Hot 100 chart and #1 in New Zealand.

Charts

Weekly charts

Year-end charts

Aaron Neville version

American singer Aaron Neville recorded a cover version of "Everybody Plays the Fool" in 1991 which also hit the Top 10 on the Billboard Hot 100 chart, reaching No. 8 in the fall of that year, and it spent 20 weeks on the chart. This was Neville's third Top 10 hit on the pop chart, following "Tell It Like It Is" (1967, No. 2) and his duet with Linda Ronstadt, "Don't Know Much" (1989, No. 2). Neville's single also went to No. 1 on the Billboard adult contemporary chart. In addition, it was a No. 1 single in New Zealand.

Critical reception
The song received a positive review from AllMusic. Alex Henderson felt that "Everybody Plays the Fool" showed that Neville still had plenty of warmth and charisma. Pan-European magazine Music & Media stated that "the New Orleans soul brother has found the right catchy tune on a reggae beat to establish his enormous vocal acrobatics on EHR level again." David Fricke from Rolling Stone described the song as a "rinky-dink reggae cover".

Music video
Neville's music video, was set in New Orleans, and his niece Arthel Neville appearing.

Charts

Weekly charts

Year-end charts

References

1972 singles
1972 songs
1991 singles
A&M Records singles
Aaron Neville songs
The Main Ingredient (band) songs
Cashbox number-one singles
Number-one singles in New Zealand
RCA Records singles
Songs written by Rudy Clark